The most recent understanding of the evolution of insects is based on studies of the following branches of science: molecular biology, insect morphology, paleontology, insect taxonomy, evolution, embryology, bioinformatics and scientific computing. It is estimated that the class of insects originated on Earth about 480 million years ago, in the Ordovician, at about the same time terrestrial plants appeared. Insects are thought to have evolved from a group of crustaceans. The first insects were landbound, but about 400 million years ago in the Devonian period one lineage of insects evolved flight, the first animals to do so. The oldest insect fossil has been proposed to be Rhyniognatha hirsti, estimated to be 400 million years old, but the insect identity of the fossil has been contested. Global climate conditions changed several times during the history of Earth, and along with it the diversity of insects. The Pterygotes (winged insects) underwent a major radiation in the Carboniferous (356 to 299 million years ago) while the Endopterygota (insects that go through different life stages with metamorphosis) underwent another major radiation in the Permian (299 to 252 million years ago).

Most extant orders of insects developed during the Permian period. Many of the early groups became extinct during the mass extinction at the Permo-Triassic boundary, the largest extinction event in the history of the Earth, around 252 million years ago. The survivors of this event evolved in the Triassic (252 to 201 million years ago) to what are essentially the modern insect orders that persist to this day. Most modern insect families appeared in the Jurassic (201 to 145 million years ago).

In an important example of co-evolution, a number of highly successful insect groups — especially the Hymenoptera (wasps, bees and ants) and Lepidoptera (butterflies) as well as many types of Diptera (flies) and Coleoptera (beetles) — evolved in conjunction with flowering plants during the Cretaceous (145 to 66 million years ago).

Many modern insect genera developed during the Cenozoic that began about 66 million years ago; insects from this period onwards frequently became preserved in amber, often in perfect condition. Such specimens are easily compared with modern species, and most of them are members of extant genera.

Fossils

Preservation

Due to their external skeleton, the fossil history of insects is not entirely dependent on lagerstätte type preservation as for many soft-bodied organisms. However, with their small size and light build, insects have not left a particularly robust fossil record. Other than insects preserved in amber, most finds are terrestrial or near terrestrial sources and only preserved under very special conditions such as at the edge of freshwater lakes. While some 1/3 of known non-insect species are extinct fossils, due to the paucity of their fossil record, only 1/100th of known insects are extinct fossils.

Insect fossils are often three dimensional preservations of the original fossil. Loose wings are a common type of fossil as the wings do not readily decay or digest, and are often left behind by predators. Fossilization will often preserve their outer appearance, contrary to vertebrate fossils whom are mostly preserved just as bony remains (or inorganic casts thereof). Due to their size, vertebrate fossils with the external aspect similarly preserved are rare, and most known cases are subfossils. Fossils of insects, when preserved, are often preserved as three-dimensional, permineralized, and charcoalified replicas; and as inclusions in amber and even within some minerals. Sometimes even their colour and patterning is still discernible. Preservation in amber is, however, limited since  copious resin production by trees only evolved in the Mesozoic.

There is also abundant fossil evidence for the behavior of extinct insects, including feeding damage on fossil vegetation and in wood, fecal pellets, and nests in fossil soils. Such preservation is rare in vertebrates, and is mostly confined to footprints and coprolites.

Freshwater and marine insect fossils
The common denominator among most deposits of fossil insects and terrestrial plants is the lake environment. Those insects that became preserved were either living in the fossil lake (autochthonous) or carried into it from surrounding habitats by winds, stream currents, or their own flight (allochthonous). Drowning and dying insects not eaten by fish and other predators settle to the bottom, where they may be preserved in the lake's sediments, called lacustrine, under appropriate conditions. Even amber, or fossil resin from trees, requires a watery environment that is lacustrine or brackish in order to be preserved. Without protection in anoxic sediments, amber would gradually disintegrate; it is never found buried in fossil soils. Various factors contribute greatly to what kinds of insects become preserved and how well, if indeed at all, including lake depth, temperature, and alkalinity; type of sediments; whether the lake was surrounded by forest or vast and featureless salt pans; and if it was choked in anoxia or highly oxygenated.

There are some major exceptions to the lacustrine theme of fossil insects, the most famous being the Late Jurassic limestones from Solnhofen and Eichstätt, Germany, which are marine. These deposits are famous for pterosaurs and the bird-like Archaeopteryx. The limestones were formed by a very fine mud of calcite that settled within stagnant, hypersaline bays isolated from inland seas. Most organisms in these limestones, including rare insects, were preserved intact, sometimes with feathers and outlines of soft wing membranes, indicating that there was very little decay. The insects, however, are like casts or molds, having relief but little detail. In some cases iron oxides precipitated around wing veins, revealing better detail.

Compressions, impressions and mineralization
There are many different ways insects can be fossilized and preserved including compressions and impressions, concretions, mineral replication, charcoalified (fusainized) remains, and their trace remains. Compressions and impressions are the most extensive types of insect fossils, occurring in rocks from the Carboniferous to the Holocene. Impressions are like a cast or mold of a fossil insect, showing its form and even some relief, like pleating in the wings, but usually little or no color from the cuticle. Compressions preserve remains of the cuticle, so color distinguishes structure. In exceptional situations, microscopic features such as microtrichia on sclerites and wing membranes are even visible, but preservation of this scale also requires a matrix of exceptionally fine grain, such as in micritic muds and volcanic tuffs. Because arthropod sclerites are held together by membranes, which readily decompose, many fossil arthropods are known only by isolated sclerites. Far more desirable are complete fossils. Concretions are stones with a fossil at the core whose chemical composition differs from that of the surrounding matrix, usually formed as a result of mineral precipitation from decaying organisms. The most significant deposit consists of various localities of the Late Carboniferous Francis Creek Shale of the Carbondale Formation at Mazon Creek, Illinois, which are composed of shales and coal seams yielding oblong concretions. Within most concretions is a mold of an animal and sometimes a plant that is usually marine in origin.

When an insect is partly or wholly replaced by minerals, usually completely articulated and with three-dimensional fidelity, is called mineral replication. This is also called petrifaction, as in petrified wood. Insects preserved this way are often, but not always, preserved as concretions, or within nodules of minerals that formed around the insect as its nucleus. Such deposits generally form where the sediments and water are laden with minerals, and where there is also quick mineralization of the carcass by coats of bacteria.

Evolutionary history
The insect fossil record extends back some 400 million years to the lower Devonian, while the Pterygotes (winged insects) underwent a major radiation in the Carboniferous. The Endopterygota underwent another major radiation in the Permian. Survivors of the mass extinction at the P-T boundary evolved in the Triassic to what are essentially the modern Insecta Orders that persist to modern times.

Most modern insect families appeared in the Jurassic, and further diversification probably in genera occurred in the Cretaceous. By the Tertiary, there existed many of what are still modern genera; hence, most insects in amber are, indeed, members of extant genera. Insects diversified in only about 100 million years into essentially modern forms.

Insect evolution is characterized by rapid adaptation due to selective pressures exerted by the environment and furthered by high fecundity. It appears that rapid radiations and the appearance of new species, a process that continues to this day, result in insects filling all available environmental niches.

The evolution of insects is closely related to the evolution of flowering plants. Insect adaptations include feeding on flowers and related structures, with some 20% of extant insects depending on flowers, nectar or pollen for their food source. This symbiotic relationship is even more paramount in evolution considering that more than 2/3 of flowering plants are insect pollinated.

Insects, particularly mosquitoes and flies, are also vectors of many pathogens that may even have been responsible for the decimation or extinction of some mammalian species.

Silurian
Molecular analysis suggests that the hexapods diverged from their sister group, the Anostraca (fairy shrimps), at around the start of the Silurian period  - coinciding with the appearance of vascular plants on land.

Devonian
The Devonian (419 to 359 million years ago) was a relatively warm period, and probably lacked any glaciers.

The details of early insect fossil records are not well understood. The fossils that were considered as Devonian insects, such as Rhyniognatha hirsti or  Strudiella devonica were later reconsidered that their affinities as insects are insufficient. But based on phylogenic study, the first insects probably appeared earlier, in the Silurian period, from stemgroup Crustraceans like Tanazios dokeron  that had lost the second antenna. The first winged insect likely evolved in the Devonian given the appearance of large numbers of insects with wings in the Carboniferous.

Carboniferous

The Carboniferous is famous for its wet, warm climates and extensive swamps of mosses, ferns, horsetails, and calamites. Glaciations in Gondwana, triggered by Gondwana's southward movement, continued into the Permian and because of the lack of clear markers and breaks, the deposits of this glacial period are often referred to as Permo-Carboniferous in age. The cooling and drying of the climate led to the Carboniferous rainforest collapse (CRC). Tropical rain forests fragmented and then were eventually devastated by climate change.

Remains of insects are scattered throughout the coal deposits, particularly of wings from stem-dictyopterans (Blattoptera); two deposits in particular are from Mazon Creek, Illinois and Commentry, France. The earliest winged insects are from this time period (Pterygota), including the aforementioned Blattoptera, Caloneurodea, primitive stem-group Ephemeropterans, Orthoptera, Palaeodictyopteroidea. In 1940 (in Noble County, Oklahoma), a fossil of Meganeuropsis americana represented the largest complete insect wing ever found. Juvenile insects are also known from the Carboniferous Period.

Very early Blattopterans had a large, discoid pronotum and coriaceous forewings with a distinct CuP vein (a unbranched wing vein, lying near the claval fold and reaching the wing posterior margin). These were not true cockroaches, as they had an ovipositor, although through the Carboniferous, the ovipositor started to diminish. The orders Caloneurodea and Miomoptera are known, with Orthoptera and Blattodea to be among the earliest Neoptera; developing from the upper Carboniferous to the Permian. These insects had wings with similar form and structure: small anal lobes. Species of Orthoptera, or grasshoppers and related kin, is an ancient order that still exist till today extending from this time period. From which time even the distinctive synapomorphy of saltatorial, or adaptive for jumping, hind legs is preserved.

Palaeodictyopteroidea is a large and diverse group that includes 50% of all known Paleozoic insects. Containing many of the primitive features of the time: very long cerci, an ovipositor, and wings with little or no anal lobe. Protodonata, as its name implies, is a primitive paraphyletic group similar to Odonata; although lacks distinct features such as a nodus, a pterostigma and an arculus. They were probably the top predators for some 100 million years and far larger than any present-day insects. Their nymphs must also have reached a very impressive size. This gigantism may have been due to higher atmospheric oxygen-levels (up to 80% above modern levels during the Carboniferous) that allowed increased respiratory efficiency relative to today. This allowed giant forms of pterygotes, millipedes and scorpions to exist, making the newly arrived tetrapods remain small until the Carboniferous Rainforest Collapse. In addition, griffinflies probably spent forest-independent life, based on head material.

Permian
The Permian was a relatively short time period, during which all the Earth's major land masses were collected into a single supercontinent known as Pangaea. Pangaea straddled the equator and extended toward the poles, with a corresponding effect on ocean currents in the single great ocean ("Panthalassa", the "universal sea"), and the Paleo-Tethys Ocean, a large ocean that was between Asia and Gondwana. The Cimmeria continent rifted away from Gondwana and drifted north to Laurasia, causing the Paleo-Tethys to shrink. At the end of the Permian, the biggest mass extinction in history occurred, collectively called the Permian–Triassic extinction event: 30% of all insect species became extinct; this is one of three known mass insect extinctions in Earth's history.

In 2009, a fossil beetle was described from the Pennsylvanian of Mazon Creek, Illinois, pushing the origin of the beetles to an earlier date, . Fossils from this time have been found in Asia and Europe, for instance in the red slate fossil beds of Niedermoschel near Mainz, Germany. Further fossils have been found in Obora, Czech Republic and Tshekarda in the Ural mountains, Russia. More discoveries from North America were made in the Wellington Formation of Oklahoma and were published in 2005 and 2008. Some of the most important fossil deposits from this era are from Elmo, Kansas (260 mya); others include New South Wales, Australia (240 mya) and central Eurasia (250 mya).

During this time, many of the species from the Carboniferous diversified, and many new orders developed, including: Protelytroptera, primitive relatives of Plecoptera (Paraplecoptera), Psocoptera, Mecoptera, Coleoptera, Raphidioptera, and Neuroptera, the last four being the first definitive records of the Holometabola. By the Pennsylvanian and well into the Permian, by far the most successful were primitive Blattoptera, or relatives of cockroaches. Six fast legs, two well-developed folding wings, fairly good eyes, long, well-developed antennae (olfactory), an omnivorous digestive system, a receptacle for storing sperm, a chitin skeleton that could support and protect, as well as a form of gizzard and efficient mouth parts, gave it formidable advantages over other herbivorous animals. About 90% of insects were cockroach-like insects ("Blattopterans"). The dragonflies Odonata were the dominant aerial predator and probably dominated terrestrial insect predation as well. True Odonata appeared in the Permian and all are amphibian. Their prototypes are the oldest winged fossils, go back to the Devonian, and are different from other wings in every way. Their prototypes may have had the beginnings of many modern attributes even by late Carboniferous and it is possible that they even captured small vertebrates, for some species had a wing span of 71 cm.

The oldest known insect that resembles species of Coleoptera date back to the Lower Permian, though they instead have 13-segmented antennae, elytra with more fully developed venation and more irregular longitudinal ribbing, and an abdomen and ovipositor extending beyond the apex of the elytra. The oldest true beetle would have features that include 11-segmented antennae, regular longitudinal ribbing on the elytra, and having genitalia that are internal. The earliest beetle-like species had pointed, leather like forewings with cells and pits. Hemiptera, or true bugs had appeared in the form of Arctiniscytina and Paraknightia. The later had expanded parapronotal lobes, a large ovipositor, and forewings with unusual venation, possibly diverging from Blattoptera. The orders Raphidioptera and Neuroptera are grouped together as Neuropterida. The one family of putative Raphidiopteran clade (Sojanoraphidiidae) has been controversially placed as so. Although the group had a long ovipositor distinctive to this order and a series of short crossveins, however with a primitive wing venation. Early families of Plecoptera had wing venation consistent with the order and its recent descendants. Psocoptera was first appeared in the Permian period, they are often regarded as the most primitive of the hemipteroids.

Triassic
The Triassic was a period when arid and semiarid savannas developed and when the first mammals, dinosaurs, and pterosaurs appeared. During the Triassic, almost all the Earth's land mass was still concentrated into Pangaea. From the east a vast gulf entered Pangaea, the Tethys sea. The remaining shores were surrounded by the world-ocean known as Panthalassa. The supercontinent Pangaea was rifting during the Triassic—especially late in the period—but had not yet separated.

The climate of the Triassic was generally hot and dry, forming typical red bed sandstones and evaporites. There is no evidence of glaciation at or near either pole; in fact, the polar regions were apparently moist and temperate, a climate suitable for reptile-like creatures. Pangaea's large size limited the moderating effect of the global ocean; its continental climate was highly seasonal, with very hot summers and cold winters. It probably had strong, cross-equatorial monsoons.

As a consequence of the P-Tr Mass Extinction at the border of Permian and Triassic, there is only little fossil record of insects including beetles from the Lower Triassic. However, there are a few exemptions, like in Eastern Europe: At the Babiy Kamen site in the Kuznetsk Basin numerous beetle fossils were discovered, even entire specimen of the infraorders Archostemata (i.e., Ademosynidae, Schizocoleidae), Adephaga (i.e., Triaplidae, Trachypachidae) and Polyphaga (i.e., Hydrophilidae, Byrrhidae, Elateroidea) and in nearly a perfectly preserved condition. However, species from the families Cupedidae and Schizophoroidae are not present at this site, whereas they dominate at other fossil sites from the Lower Triassic. Further records are known from Khey-Yaga, Russia in the Korotaikha Basin.

Around this time, during the Late Triassic, mycetophagous, or fungus feeding species of beetle (i.e., Cupedidae) appear in the fossil record. In the stages of the Upper Triassic representatives of the algophagous, or algae feeding species (i.e., Triaplidae and Hydrophilidae) begin to appear, as well as predatory water beetles. The first primitive weevils appear (i.e., Obrienidae), as well as the first representatives of the rove beetles (i.e., Staphylinidae), which show no marked difference in physique compared to recent species. This was also around the first time evidence of diverse freshwater insect fauna appeared.

Some of the oldest living families also appear around during the Triassic. Hemiptera included the Cercopidae, the Cicadellidae, the Cixiidae, and the Membracidae. Coleoptera included the Carabidae, the Staphylinidae, and the Trachypachidae. Hymenoptera included the Xyelidae. Diptera included the Anisopodidae, the Chironomidae, and the Tipulidae. The first Thysanoptera appeared as well.

The first true species of Diptera are known from the Middle Triassic, becoming widespread during the Middle and Late Triassic . A single large wing from a species of Diptera in the Triassic (10 mm instead of usual 2–6 mm) was found in Australia (Mt. Crosby). This family Tilliardipteridae, despite of the numerous 'tipuloid' features, should be included in Psychodomorpha sensu Hennig on account of loss of the convex distal 1A reaching wing margin and formation of the anal loop.

Jurassic
The Jurassic was important in the development of birds, one of the insects' major predators. During the early Jurassic period, the supercontinent Pangaea broke up into the northern supercontinent Laurasia and the southern supercontinent Gondwana; the Gulf of Mexico opened in the new rift between North America and what is now Mexico's Yucatan Peninsula. The Jurassic North Atlantic Ocean was relatively narrow, while the South Atlantic did not open until the following Cretaceous Period, when Gondwana itself rifted apart.

The global climate during the Jurassic was warm and humid. Similar to the Triassic, there were no larger landmasses situated near the polar caps and consequently, no inland ice sheets existed during the Jurassic. Although some areas of North and South America and Africa stayed arid, large parts of the continental landmasses were lush. The laurasian and the gondwanian fauna differed considerably in the Early Jurassic. Later it became more intercontinental and many species started to spread globally.

There are many important sites from the Jurassic, with more than 150 important sites with beetle fossils, the majority being situated in Eastern Europe and North Asia. In North America and especially in South America and Africa the number of sites from that time period is smaller and the sites have not been exhaustively investigated yet. Outstanding fossil sites include Solnhofen in Upper Bavaria, Germany, Karatau in South Kazakhstan, the Yixian Formation in Liaoning, North China as well as the Jiulongshan Formation and further fossil sites in Mongolia. In North America there are only a few sites with fossil records of insects from the Jurassic, namely the shell limestone deposits in the Hartford basin, the Deerfield basin and the Newark basin. Numerous deposits of other insects occur in Europe and Asia. Including Grimmen and Solnhofen, German; Solnhofen being famous for findings of the earliest bird-like theropods (i.e. Archaeopteryx). Others include Dorset, England; Issyk-Kul, Kirghizstan; and the most productive site of all, Karatau, Kazakhstan.

This includes the development and growth of carnivorous and herbivorous species. Species of the superfamily Chrysomeloidea are believed to have developed around the same time, which include a wide array of plant host ranging from cycads and conifers, to angiosperms. Close to the Upper Jurassic, the portion of the Cupedidae decreased, however at the same time the diversity of the early plant eating, or phytophagous species increased. Most of the recent phytophagous species of Coleoptera feed on flowering plants or angiosperms.

Cretaceous

The Cretaceous had much of the same insect fauna as the Jurassic until much later on. During the Cretaceous, the late-Paleozoic-to-early-Mesozoic supercontinent of Pangaea completed its tectonic breakup into present day continents, although their positions were substantially different at the time. As the Atlantic Ocean widened, the convergent-margin orogenies that had begun during the Jurassic continued in the North American Cordillera, as the Nevadan orogeny was followed by the Sevier and Laramide orogenies. Though Gondwana was still intact in the beginning of the Cretaceous, it broke up as South America, Antarctica and Australia rifted away from Africa (though India and Madagascar remained attached to each other); thus, the South Atlantic and Indian Oceans were newly formed. Such active rifting lifted great undersea mountain chains along the welts, raising eustatic sea levels worldwide. To the north of Africa the Tethys Sea continued to narrow. Broad shallow seas advanced across central North America (the Western Interior Seaway) and Europe, then receded late in the period, leaving thick marine deposits sandwiched between coal beds.

At the peak of the Cretaceous transgression, one-third of Earth's present land area was submerged. The Berriasian epoch showed a cooling trend that had been seen in the last epoch of the Jurassic. There is evidence that snowfalls were common in the higher latitudes and the tropics became wetter than during the Triassic and Jurassic. Glaciation was however restricted to alpine glaciers on some high-latitude mountains, though seasonal snow may have existed farther south. Rafting by ice of stones into marine environments occurred during much of the Cretaceous but evidence of deposition directly from glaciers is limited to the Early Cretaceous of the Eromanga Basin in southern Australia.

There are a large number of important fossil sites worldwide containing beetles from the Cretaceous. Most of them are located in Europe and Asia and belong to the temperate climate zone during the Cretaceous. A few of the fossil sites mentioned in the chapter Jurassic also shed some light on the early cretaceous beetle fauna (e.g. the Yixian formation in Liaoning, North China). Further important sites from the Lower Cretaceous include the Crato Fossil Beds in the Araripe basin in the Ceará, North Brazil as well as overlying Santana formation, with the latter was situated near the paleoequator, or the position of the earth's equator in the geologic past as defined for a specific geologic period. In Spain there are important sites near Montsec and Las Hoyas. In Australia the Koonwarra fossil beds of the Korumburra group, South Gippsland, Victoria is noteworthy. Important fossil sites from the Upper Cretaceous are Kzyl-Dzhar in South Kazakhstan and Arkagala in Russia.

During the Cretaceous the diversity of Cupedidae and Archostemata decreased considerably. Predatory ground beetles (Carabidae) and rove beetles (Staphylinidae) began to distribute into different patterns: whereas the Carabidae predominantly occurred in the warm regions, the Staphylinidae and click beetles (Elateridae) preferred many areas with temperate climate. Likewise, predatory species of Cleroidea and Cucujoidea, hunted their prey under the bark of trees together with the jewel beetles (Buprestidae). The jewel beetles diversity increased rapidly during the Cretaceous, as they were the primary consumers of wood, while longhorn beetles (Cerambycidae) were rather rare and their diversity increased only towards the end of the Upper Cretaceous. The first coprophagous beetles have been recorded from the Upper Cretaceous, and are believed to have lived on the excrement of herbivorous dinosaurs, however there is still a discussion, whether the beetles were always tied to mammals during its development. Also, the first species with an adaption of both larvae and adults to the aquatic lifestyle are found. Whirligig beetles (Gyrinidae) were moderately diverse, although other early beetles (i.e., Dytiscidae) were less, with the most widespread being the species of Coptoclavidae, which preyed on aquatic fly larvae.

Paleogene
There are many fossils of beetles known from this era, though the beetle fauna of the Paleocene is comparatively poorly investigated. In contrast, the knowledge on the Eocene beetle fauna is very good. The reason is the occurrence of fossil insects in amber and clay slate sediments. Amber is fossilized tree resin, that means it consists of fossilized organic compounds, not minerals. Different amber is distinguished by location, age and species of the resin producing plant. For the research on the Oligocene beetle fauna, Baltic and Dominican amber is most important. Even with the insect fossils record in general lacking, the most diverse deposit being from the Fur Formation, Denmark; including giant ants and primitive moths (Noctuidae).

The first butterflies are from the Upper Paleogene, while most, like beetles, already had recent genera and species already existed during the Miocene, however, their distribution differed considerably from today's.

Neogene
The most important sites for beetle fossils of the Neogene are situated in the warm temperate and to subtropical zones. Many recent genera and species already existed during the Miocene, however, their distribution differed considerably from today's. One of the most important fossil sites for insects of the Pliocene is Willershausen near Göttingen, Germany with excellently preserved beetle fossils of various families (longhorn beetles, weevils, ladybugs and others) as well as representatives of other orders of insects. In the Willershausen clay pit so far 35 genera from 18 beetle families have been recorded, of which six genera are extinct. The Pleistocene beetle fauna is relatively well known, since the composition of the beetle fauna has been used to reconstruct climate conditions in the Rocky Mountains and on Beringia, the former land bridge between Asia and North America.

Phylogeny

A report in November 2014 unambiguously places the insects in one clade, with the remipedes as the nearest sister clade. This study resolved insect phylogeny of all extant insect orders, and provides "a robust phylogenetic backbone tree and reliable time estimates of insect evolution." Finding strong support for the closest living relatives of the hexapods had proven challenging due to convergent adaptations in a number of arthropod groups for living on land.

In 2008, researchers at Tufts University uncovered what they believe is the world's oldest known full-body impression of a primitive flying insect, a 300 million-year-old specimen from the Carboniferous Period. Devonian Rhyniognatha hirsti, from the 396 million year old Rhynie chert is known only from mandibles, and considered as the oldest insect. This species already possessed dicondylic mandibles (two articulations in the mandible), a feature associated with winged insects, suggesting that wings may already have evolved at this time. Thus, if Rhyniognatha is actual flying insect, the first insects probably appeared earlier, in the Silurian period. However, this species is also considered as myriapod in later study. There have been four super radiations of insects: beetles (evolved around ), flies (evolved around ), moths and wasps (evolved around ). These four groups account for the majority of described species. The flies and moths along with the fleas evolved from the Mecoptera. The origins of insect flight remain obscure, since the earliest winged insects currently known appear to have been capable fliers. Some extinct insects had an additional pair of winglets attaching to the first segment of the thorax, for a total of three pairs. There is no evidence that suggests that the insects were a particularly successful group of animals before they evolved to have wings.

Evolutionary relationships
Insects are prey for a variety of organisms, including terrestrial vertebrates. The earliest vertebrates on land existed  and were large amphibious piscivores, through gradual evolutionary change, insectivory was the next diet type to evolve. Insects were among the earliest terrestrial herbivores and acted as major selection agents on plants. Plants evolved chemical defenses against this herbivory and the insects in turn evolved mechanisms to deal with plant toxins. These toxins limit the diet breadth of herbivores, and evolving mechanisms to nonetheless continue herbivory is an important part of maintaining diet breadth in insects, and so in their evolutionary history as a whole. Both pleiotropy and epistasis have complex effects in this regard, with the simulations of Griswold 2006 showing that more genes provide the benefit of more targets for adaptive mutations, while Fisher 1930 showed that a mutation can improve one trait while epistasis causes it to also trigger negative effects - slowing down adaptation.

Many insects also make use of these toxins to protect themselves from their predators. Such insects often advertise their toxicity using warning colors. This successful evolutionary pattern has also been utilized by mimics. Over time, this has led to complex groups of coevolved species. Conversely, some interactions between plants and insects, like pollination, are beneficial to both organisms. Coevolution has led to the development of very specific mutualisms in such systems.

Taxonomy

Traditional morphology-based or appearance-based systematics has usually given Hexapoda the rank of superclass, and identified four groups within it: insects (Ectognatha), springtails (Collembola), Protura and Diplura, the latter three being grouped together as Entognatha on the basis of internalized mouth parts. Supraordinal relationships have undergone numerous changes with the advent of methods based on evolutionary history and genetic data. A recent theory is that Hexapoda is polyphyletic (where the last common ancestor was not a member of the group), with the entognath classes having separate evolutionary histories from Insecta. Many of the traditional appearance-based taxa have been shown to be paraphyletic, so rather than using ranks like subclass, superorder and infraorder, it has proved better to use monophyletic groupings (in which the last common ancestor is a member of the group). The following represents the best supported monophyletic groupings for the Insecta.

Insects can be divided into two groups historically treated as subclasses: wingless insects, known as Apterygota, and winged insects, known as Pterygota. The Apterygota consist of the primitively wingless order of the silverfish (Thysanura). Archaeognatha make up the Monocondylia based on the shape of their mandibles, while Thysanura and Pterygota are grouped together as Dicondylia. It is possible that the Thysanura themselves are not monophyletic, with the family Lepidotrichidae being a sister group to the Dicondylia (Pterygota and the remaining Thysanura).

Paleoptera and Neoptera are the winged orders of insects differentiated by the presence of hardened body parts called sclerites; also, in Neoptera, muscles that allow their wings to fold flatly over the abdomen. Neoptera can further be divided into incomplete metamorphosis-based (Polyneoptera and Paraneoptera) and complete metamorphosis-based groups. It has proved difficult to clarify the relationships between the orders in Polyneoptera because of constant new findings calling for revision of the taxa. For example, Paraneoptera has turned out to be more closely related to Endopterygota than to the rest of the Exopterygota. The recent molecular finding that the traditional louse orders Mallophaga and Anoplura are derived from within Psocoptera has led to the new taxon Psocodea. Phasmatodea and Embiidina have been suggested to form Eukinolabia. Mantodea, Blattodea and Isoptera are thought to form a monophyletic group termed Dictyoptera.

It is likely that Exopterygota is paraphyletic in regard to Endopterygota. Matters that have had a lot of controversy include Strepsiptera and Diptera grouped together as Halteria based on a reduction of one of the wing pairs – a position not well-supported in the entomological community. The Neuropterida are often lumped or split on the whims of the taxonomist. Fleas are now thought to be closely related to boreid mecopterans. Many questions remain to be answered when it comes to basal relationships amongst endopterygote orders, particularly Hymenoptera.

The study of the classification or taxonomy of any insect is called systematic entomology. If one works with a more specific order or even a family, the term may also be made specific to that order or family, for example systematic dipterology.

Early evidence
According to phylogenic estimation, first insects possibly appeared in the Silurian period and got wings in Devonian.

The subclass Apterygota (wingless insects) is now considered artificial as the silverfish (order Thysanura) are more closely related to Pterygota (winged insects) than to bristletails (order Archaeognatha). For instance, just like flying insects, Thysanura have so-called dicondylic mandibles, while Archaeognatha have monocondylic mandibles. The reason for their resemblance is not due to a particularly close relationship, but rather because they both have kept a primitive and original anatomy in a much higher degree than the winged insects. The most primitive order of flying insects, the mayflies (Ephemeroptera), are also those who are most morphologically and physiologically similar to these wingless insects. Some mayfly nymphs resemble aquatic thysanurans.

Modern Archaeognatha and Thysanura still have rudimentary appendages on their abdomen called styli, while more primitive and extinct insects known as Monura had much more developed abdominal appendages. The abdominal and thoracic segments in the earliest terrestrial ancestor of the insects would have been more similar to each other than they are today, and the head had well-developed compound eyes and long antennae. Their body size is not known yet. As the most primitive group today, Archaeognatha, is most abundant near the coasts, it could mean that this was the kind of habitat where the insect ancestors became terrestrial. But this specialization to coastal niches could also have a secondary origin, just as could their jumping locomotion, as it is the crawling Thysanura who are considered to be most original (plesiomorphic). By looking at how primitive cheliceratan book gills (still seen in horseshoe crabs) evolved into book lungs in primitive spiders and finally into tracheae in more advanced spiders (most of them still have a pair of book lungs intact as well), it is possible the trachea of insects was formed in a similar way, modifying gills at the base of their appendages.

So far, no published research suggests that insects were a particularly successful group prior to their evolution of wings.

Odonata
The Odonata (dragonflies) are also a good candidate as the oldest living member of the Pterygota. Mayflies are morphologically and physiologically more basal, but the derived characteristics of dragonflies could have evolved independently in their own direction for a long time. It seems that orders with aquatic nymphs or larvae become evolutionarily conservative once they had adapted to water. If mayflies made it to the water first, this could partly explain why they are more primitive than dragonflies, even if dragonflies have an older origin. Similarly, stoneflies retain the most basal traits of the Neoptera, but they were not necessarily the first order to branch off. This also makes it less likely that an aquatic ancestor would have the evolutionary potential to give rise to all the different forms and species of insects that we know today.

Dragonfly nymphs have a unique labial "mask" used for catching prey, and the imago has a unique way of copulating, using a secondary male sex organ on the second abdominal segment. It looks like abdominal appendages modified for sperm transfer and direct insemination have occurred at least twice in insect evolution, once in Odonata and once in the other flying insects. If these two different methods are the original ways of copulating for each group, it is a strong indication that it is the dragonflies who are the oldest, not the mayflies. There is still not agreement about this. Another scenario is that abdominal appendages adapted for direct insemination have evolved three times in insects; once Odonata, once in mayflies and once in the Neoptera, both mayflies and Neoptera choosing the same solution. If so, it is still possible that mayflies are the oldest order among the flying insects. The power of flight is assumed to have evolved only once, suggesting sperm was still transferred indirectly in the earliest flying insects.

One possible scenario on how direct insemination evolved in insects is seen in scorpions. The male deposits a spermatophore on the ground, locks its claws with the female's claws and then guides her over his packet of sperm, making sure it comes in contact with her genital opening. When the early (male) insects laid their spermatophores on the ground, it seems likely that some of them used the clasping organs at the end of their body to drag the female over the package. The ancestors of Odonata evolved the habit of grabbing the female behind her head, as they still do today. This action, rather than not grasping the female at all, would have increased the male's chances of spreading its genes. The chances would be further increased if they first attached their spermatophore safely on their own abdomen before they placed their abdominal claspers behind the female's head; the male would then not let the female go before her abdomen had made direct contact with his sperm storage, allowing the transfer of all sperm.

This also meant increased freedom in searching for a female mate because the males could now transport the packet of sperm elsewhere if the first female slipped away. This ability would eliminate the need to either wait for another female at the site of the deposited sperm packet or to produce a new packet, wasting energy. Other advantages include the possibility of mating in other, safer places than flat ground, such as in trees or bushes.

If the ancestors of the other flying insects evolved the same habit of clasping the female and dragging her over their spermatophore, but posterior instead of anterior like the Odonata does, their genitals would come very close to each other. And from there on, it would be a very short step to modify the vestigial appendages near the male genital opening to transfer the sperm directly into the female. The same appendages the male Odonata use to transfer their sperm to their secondary sexual organs at the front of their abdomen. All insects with an aquatic nymphal or larval stage seem to have adapted to water secondarily from terrestrial ancestors. Of the most primitive insects with no wings at all, Archaeognatha and Thysanura, all members live their entire life cycle in terrestrial environments. As mentioned previously, Archaeognatha were the first to split off from the branch that led to the winged insects (Pterygota), and then the Thysanura branched off. This indicates that these three groups (Archaeognatha, Thysanura and Pterygota) have a common terrestrial ancestor, which probably resembled a primitive model of Apterygota, was an opportunistic generalist and laid spermatophores on the ground instead of copulating, like Thysanura still do today. If it had feeding habits similar to the majority of apterygotes of today, it lived mostly as a decomposer.

One should expect that a gill breathing arthropod would modify its gills to breathe air if it were adapting to terrestrial environments, and not evolve new respiration organs from bottom up next to the original and still functioning ones. Then comes the fact that insect (larva and nymph) gills are actually a part of a modified, closed trachea system specially adapted for water, called tracheal gills. The arthropod trachea can only arise in an atmosphere and as a consequence of the adaptations of living on land. This too indicates that insects are descended from a terrestrial ancestor.

And finally when looking at the three most primitive insects with aquatic nymphs (called naiads: Ephemeroptera, Odonata and Plecoptera), each order has its own kind of tracheal gills that are so different from one another that they must have separate origins. This would be expected if they evolved from land-dwelling species. This means that one of the most interesting parts of insect evolution is what happened between the Thysanura-Pterygota split and the first flight.

Origin of insect flight
The origin of insect flight remains obscure, since the earliest winged insects currently known appear to have been capable fliers. Some extinct insects (e.g. the Palaeodictyoptera) had an additional pair of winglets attached to the first segment of the thorax, for a total of three pairs.

The wings themselves are sometimes said to be highly modified (tracheal) gills. By comparing a well-developed pair of gill blades in mayfly naiads and a reduced pair of hind wings on the adults, it is not hard to imagine that the mayfly gills (tergaliae) and insect wings have a common origin, and newer research also supports this. Specifically, genetic research on mayflies has revealed that the gills and insect wings both may have originated from insect legs. The tergaliae are not found in any other order of insects, and they have evolved in different directions with time. In some nymphs/naiads the most anterior pair has become sclerotized and works as a gill cover for the rest of the gills. Others can form a large sucker, be used for swimming or modified into other shapes. But that need not necessarily mean that these structures were originally gills. It could also mean that the tergaliae evolved from the same structures which gave rise to the wings, and that flying insects evolved from a wingless terrestrial species with pairs of plates on its body segments: three on the thorax and nine on the abdomen (mayfly nymphs with nine pairs of tergaliae on the abdomen exist, but so far no living or extinct insects with plates on the last two segments have been found). If these were primary gills, it would be a mystery why they should have waited so long to be modified when we see the different modifications in modern mayfly nymphs.

Theories
When the first forests arose on Earth, new niches for terrestrial animals were created. Spore-feeders and others who depended on plants and/or the animals living around them would have to adapt too to make use of them. In a world with no flying animals, it would probably just be a matter of time before some arthropods who were living in the trees evolved paired structures with muscle attachments from their exoskeleton and used them for gliding, one pair on each segment. Further evolution in this direction would give bigger gliding structures on their thorax and gradually smaller ones on their abdomen. Their bodies would have become stiffer while thysanurans, which never evolved flight, kept their flexible abdomen.

Mayfly nymphs must have adapted to water while they still had the "gliders" on their abdomen intact. So far there is no concrete evidence to support this theory either, but it is one that offers an explanation for the problems of why presumably aquatic animals evolved in the direction they did.

Leaping and arboreal insects seems like a good explanation for this evolutionary process for several reasons. Because early winged insects were lacking the sophisticated wing folding mechanism of neopterous insects, they must have lived in the open and not been able to hide or search for food under leaves, in cracks, under rocks and other such confined spaces. In these old forests there were few open places where insects with huge structures on their back could have lived without experiencing huge disadvantages. If insects got their wings on land and not in water, which clearly seems to be the case, the tree canopies would be the most obvious place where such gliding structures could have emerged, in a time when the air was a new territory.

The question is if the plates used for gliding evolved from "scratch" or by modifying already existing anatomical details. The thorax in Thysanura and Archaeognatha are known to have some structures connected to their trachea which share similarities to the wings of primitive insects. This suggests the origin of the wings and the spiracles are related.

Gliding requires universal body modifications, as seen in present-day vertebrates such as some rodents and marsupials, which have grown wide, flat expansions of skin for this purpose. The flying dragons (genus Draco) of Indonesia has modified its ribs into gliders, and even some snakes can glide through the air by spreading their ribs. The main difference is that while vertebrates have an inner skeleton, primitive insects had a flexible and adaptive exoskeleton.

Some animals would be living in the trees, as animals are always taking advantage of all available niches, both for feeding and protection. At the time, the reproductive organs were by far the most nutritious part of the plant, and these early plants show signs of arthropod consumption and adaptations to protect themselves, for example by placing their reproductive organs as high up as possible. But there will always be some species who will be able to cope with that by following their food source up the trees. Knowing that insects were terrestrial at that time and that some arthropods (like primitive insects) were living in the tree crowns, it seems less likely that they would have developed their wings down on the ground or in the water.

In a three dimensional environment such as trees, the ability to glide would increase the insects' chances to survive a fall, as well as saving energy. This trait has repeated itself in modern wingless species such as the gliding ants who are living an arboreal life. When the gliding ability first had originated, gliding and leaping behavior would be a logical next step, which would eventually be reflected in their anatomical design. The need to navigate through vegetation and to land safely would mean good muscle control over the proto-wings, and further improvements would eventually lead to true (but primitive) wings. While the thorax got the wings, a long abdomen could have served as a stabilizer in flight.

Some of the earliest flying insects were large predators: it was a new ecological niche. Some of the prey were no doubt other insects, as insects with proto-wings would have radiated into other species even before the wings were fully evolved. From this point on, the arms race could continue: the same predator/prey co-evolution which has existed as long as there have been predators and prey on earth; both the hunters and the hunted were in need of improving and extending their flight skills even further to keep up with the other.

Insects that had evolved their proto-wings in a world without flying predators could afford to be exposed openly without risk, but this changed when carnivorous flying insects evolved. It is unknown when they first evolved, but once these predators had emerged they put a strong selection pressure on their victims and themselves. Those of the prey who came up with a good solution about how to fold their wings over their backs in a way that made it possible for them to live in narrow spaces would not only be able to hide from flying predators (and terrestrial predators if they were on the ground) but also to exploit a wide variety of niches that were closed to those unable to fold their wings in this way. And today the neopterous insects (those that can fold their wings back over the abdomen) are by far the most dominant group of insects.

The water-skimming theory suggests that skimming on the water surface is the origin of insect flight. This theory is based on the fact that what may be the first fossil insects, the Devonian Rhyniognatha hirsti—though it may be closer to the myriapods, is thought to have possessed wings, even though the insects' closest evolutionary ties are with crustaceans, which are aquatic.

Life cycle

Mayflies
Another primitive trait of the mayflies are the subimago; no other insects have this winged yet sexually immature stage. A few specialized species have females with no subimago, but retain the subimago stage for males.

The reasons the subimago still exists in this order could be that there has never been enough selection pressure to get rid of it; it also seems specially adapted to do the transition from water to air.

The male genitalia are not fully functional at this point. One reason for this could be that the modification of the abdominal appendages into male copulation organs emerged later than the evolution of flight. This is indicated by the fact that dragonflies have a different copulation organ than other insects.

As we know, in mayflies the nymphs and the adults are specialized for two different ways of living; in the water and in the air. The only stage (instar) between these two is the subimago. In more primitive fossil forms, the preadult individuals had not just one instar but numerous ones (while the modern subimago do not eat, older and more primitive species with a subimagos were probably feeding in this phase of life too as the lines between the instars were much more diffuse and gradual than today). Adult form was reached several moults before maturity. They probably did not have more instars after becoming fully mature. This way of maturing is how Apterygota do it, which moult even when mature, but not winged insects.

Modern mayflies have eliminated all the instars between imago and nymph, except the single instar called subimago, which is still not (at least not in the males) fully sexually mature. The other flying insects with incomplete metamorphosis (Exopterygota) have gone a little further and completed the trend; here all the immature structures of the animal from the last nymphal stage are completed at once in a single final moult. The more advanced insects with larvae and complete metamorphosis (Endopterygota) have gone even further. An interesting theory is that the pupal stage is actually a strongly modified and extended stage of subimago, but so far it is nothing more than a theory. There are some insects within the Exopterygota, thrips and whiteflies (Aleyrodidae), who have evolved pupae-like stages too.

Distant ancestors
The distant ancestor of flying insects, a species with primitive proto-wings, had a more or less ametabolous life-cycle and instars of basically the same type as thysanurans with no defined nymphal, subimago or adult stages as the individual became older. Individuals developed gradually as they were grew and moulting, but probably without major changes inbetween instars.

Modern mayfly nymphs do not acquire gills until after their first moult. Before this stage they are so small that they need no gills to extract oxygen from the water. This could be a trait from the common ancestor of all flyers. An early terrestrial insect would have no need for paired outgrowths from the body before it started to live in the trees (or in the water, for that matter), so it would not have any.

This would also affect the way their offspring looked like in the early instars, resembling earlier ametabolous generations even after they had started to adapt to a new way of living, in a habitat where they actually could have some good use for flaps along their body. Since they matured in the same way as thysanurans with plenty of moultings as they were growing and very little difference between the adults and much younger individuals (unlike modern insects, which are hemimetabolous or holometabolous), there probably was not as much room for adaptation into different niches depending on age and stage. Also, it would have been difficult for an animal already adapted to a niche to make a switch to a new niche later in life based on age or size differences alone when these differences were not significant.

So proto-insects had to specialize and focus their whole existence on improving a single lifestyle in a particular niche. The older the species and the single individuals became, the more would they differ from their original form as they adapted to their new lifestyles better than the generations before. The final body-structure was no longer achieved while still inside the egg, but continued to develop for most of a lifetime, causing a bigger difference between the youngest and oldest individuals. Assuming that mature individuals most likely mastered their new element better than did the nymphs who had the same lifestyle, it would appear to be an advantage if the immature members of the species reached adult shape and form as soon as possible. This may explain why they evolved fewer but more intense instars and a stronger focus on the adult body, and with greater differences between the adults and the first instars, instead of just gradually growing bigger as earlier generations had done. This evolutionary trend explains how they went from ametabolous to hemimetabolous insects.

Reaching maturity and a fully-grown body became only a part of the development process; gradually a new anatomy and new abilities - only possible in the later stages of life - emerged. The anatomy insects were born and grew up with had limitations which the adults who had learned to fly did not suffer from. If they were unable to live their early life the way adults did, immature individuals had to adapt to the best way of living and surviving despite their limitations till the moment came when they could leave them behind. This would be a starting point in the evolution where imago and nymphs started to live in different niches, some more clearly defined than others. Also, a final anatomy, size and maturity reached at once with a single final nymphal stage meant less waste of time and energy, and also made a more complex adult body structure. These strategies obviously became very successful with time.

See also
Evolution of arthropods
Evolution of butterflies
Evolution of spiders

References

External links
What arthropod brains say about arthropod phylogeny
Ecological history of the terrestrial insects
Geographical history of the insects
The Primitive Characters of Extant Mayflies (Ephemeroptera)
The insect abdomen and terminalia
Morphology of Ephemeroptera
International Palaeoentomological Society